Sherihan (born 6 December 1964) is an Egyptian actress, singer and classically trained dancer.

Biography
Sherihan started acting at the age of four. She is mostly known for Fawazir Ramadan. She retired in 2002 and came out of retirement in 2016. In 2021, she made her stage return after a 20-year hiatus from acting by starring in Coco Chanel play.

Personal life
Sherihan is a half-sister of Omar Khorshid. She married Jordanian businessman Alaa Khawaja, with whom she has two daughters.

In 1990, she had a terrible accident, in which she broke her back including the spine. In 2002, she suffered from Salivary gland tumours, which forced her to retire from acting.

Sherihan is a popular Egyptian nationalist too and was a main participating figure in her homeland's revolution in 2011 demanding the removal of president Hosni Mubarak.

Partial filmography

Television

Theater 

‏مسرحية كوكو شنل 20 21
| 2022
  2022 FIFA World Cup Draw Special Guest

References

External links 
 
 

1964 births
Egyptian film actresses
Living people
Actresses from Cairo
Egyptian television actresses
Egyptian stage actresses
Egyptian nationalists
Egyptian revolutionaries